Dubrovka is a rural locality (a village) in Bolshekarkalinksy Selsoviet, Miyakinsky District, Bashkortostan, Russia. The population was 83 as of 2010. There is 1 street.

Geography 
Dubrovka is located 24 km southeast of Kirgiz-Miyaki (the district's administrative centre) by road. Uyazybashevo is the nearest rural locality.

References 

Rural localities in Miyakinsky District